Ulla Strömstedt (27 November 1939 – 13 June 1986) was a Swedish-born actress who appeared in several films and television shows.

Career
Strömstedt's most memorable acting credits include her role in the TV series, Flipper (1965–66), and in the 1967 film, Catalina Caper. She also appeared in episodes of numerous 1960s TV shows, including Hogan's Heroes (1966–68) and Tarzan (1967).

Strömstedt studied post-baccalaureate in Stockholm, language and art at the Sorbonne in Paris, and theater studies in the United States at the Actors Studio.

Personal life
In 1960, she was elected to the first Mälardrottningen in Stockholm. In 1961, she married Gilbert Cole in Los Angeles. She had one son, Jonathan Strömstedt Cole.

In 1986, Strömstedt died in Cannes, France.

Partial filmography 
 The Tab Hunter Show – "Marie" in episode "Dream Boy" (episode 1.29) 9 April 1961
 Den Gula Bilen [in English: The Yellow Car] (1963) – Kerstin Björk
 Do Not Disturb (1965) – minor role (uncredited)
 Flipper (1965–1966) – 12 episodes as "Ulla Norstrand"
 I Spy – "Tilde" in episode "Rome... Take Away Three" (episode 2.16) 28 December 1966
 The Rat Patrol – "Ilse Greuner" in episode "Mask-a Raid" (episode  1.30) 10 April 1967
 Mister Terrific – "Tanya" in episode "Try This on for Spies" (episode  1.5) 24 April 1967
 Tarzan (1967) – Mary Singleton in episode "The Blue Stone of Heaven: Part 1" (episode 2.4) 6 October 1967 and in episode "The Blue Stone of Heaven: Part 2" (episode # 2.5) 13 October 1967
 Catalina Caper (1967) – Katrina Corelli
 Hogan's Heroes – "Myra" in episode "Diamond in the Rough" (episode 2.3) 30 September 1966; "Gretel" in episode "Sticky Wicket Newkirk" (episode  3.20) 20 January 1968 
 Achtung Zoll! – "Actress" in episode "Apoll" (episode 2.21) 1 June 1981
 50 Greatest TV Animals (2003) (TV) – Ulla Norstrand from Flipper (uncredited)

References

External links 
 
 Hogan's Heroes Fanclub
 Webstalag 13
 The Hofbrau
 Glamour Girls of the Silver Screen

1939 births
1986 deaths
University of Paris alumni
Swedish film actresses
Swedish television actresses
20th-century Swedish actresses